Patrick Gabriel (born 18 November 1962) is a French football manager and former midfielder.

References

External links
 

Living people
1962 births
Association football midfielders
French footballers
French football managers
Ligue 1 players
Ligue 2 players
AS Nancy Lorraine players
Tours FC players
AS Nancy Lorraine managers